Arene bairdii is a species of sea snail, a marine gastropod mollusc in the family Areneidae.

Description

The shell can grow up to be 3.5 mm to 8 mm in length.

Distribution
Arene bairdii can be found from the Southeast USA to South Brazil.

References

Areneidae
Gastropods described in 1889